Ryan Thomson (born 13 April 1991, in Glasgow) is a Scottish footballer who plays as a midfielder who plays for Scottish club Darvel in the sixth tier of Scottish football. Thomson has previously played for Dunfermline Athletic, Dumbarton and Stranraer, as well as Albion Rovers on loan.

Career
In February of the 2009–10 season, Thomson was loaned to Scottish Third Division side Albion Rovers, making 15 appearances and scoring 1 goal. He made his first-team debut for the Dunfermline as a substitute on 5 November 2010 in a 2–1 defeat to Morton and began to make regular appearances from the bench towards the end of the 2010–11 season.

With the Pars promoted to the SPL for the 2011–12 season, Thomson continued to make appearances from the bench, and scored his first goal for the club away to Kilmarnock in a 3–2 defeat on 10 September 2011. After seven years with The Pars, Thomson was released by the side at the end of the 2014–15 season. Shortly after leaving Dunfermline, Thomson signed a contract with Stranraer, spending three years with the club before leaving in May 2018. After leaving the Blues he joined up with former manager Stevie Aitken at fellow Scottish League One side Dumbarton. He left the Sons in May 2019 after making just 14 starts in all competitions and rejoined former club Stranraer. In June 2020, Thomson made the switch to West of Scotland Football League side Darvel.

Career statistics

References

External links
 

1991 births
Living people
Footballers from Glasgow
Scottish footballers
Association football midfielders
Dunfermline Athletic F.C. players
Albion Rovers F.C. players
Scottish Football League players
Scottish Premier League players
Scottish Professional Football League players
Dumbarton F.C. players
Stranraer F.C. players
West of Scotland Football League players